Dagbani music and dance is a core tradition of the Dagbamba of West Africa. The Dagbamba speak the Dagbanli language. They are the dominant ethnic group in the kingdom of Dagbon found in the Northern Region of Ghana. Music and dance plays a central role in Dagbon. It is through these arts that the Dagbamba have preserved their history over the centuries. The Dagbamba regard dancing as a form of emotional expression, social interaction, a spiritual performance or even physical exercise that aids them articulate or illustrate ideas or tell a story. In most cases, music in Dagbon is accompanied by dancing in order to form a complete story.

Music in Dagbon

Dagbani music is best known for an extremely advanced drumming tradition, especially using the lunga and gungon.

Dancing in Dagbon

Dagbon music is usually composed specifically to facilitate or accompany dancing.

Contemporary Music and Dance
The Dagbamba have embraced and incorporated modern forms of music though traditional dagbani music and dancing can still be witnessed at formal congregations and at Universities around the world . Locally, it has become much easier to hear Dagbanli music in non-traditional genres like Reggae, Hip hop, Hiplife or Islamic music. On very rare occasions non-traditional Dagbanli music is blended with traditional elements such as drumming.

Modern artists who perform in Dagbanli include Sherifa Gunu, R2bees, Sherif Ghaale, and Awal Alhassan.

The rhythm game series Just Dance features the sound track "Dagomba" in their games. Composed by Sorcerer, the song samples music of the Dagomba people.

See also
Kambon-waa
Damba festival

References

Dagbon
Ghanaian culture